Magister Salernus (died 1167) was a medieval alchemist from the School of Salerno who provided one of the first recipes for the fractional distillation of alcohol.  He was one of the supposed founders of the Salerno School, along with the Jewish Helinus, the Greek Pontus, and the Arab Adela.

References

See also
 Timeline of chemistry

Year of birth unknown
1167 deaths
12th-century alchemists
Italian alchemists